William Keith Relf (22 March 194312 May 1976) was an English musician, best known as the lead vocalist and harmonica player for rock band the Yardbirds. He then formed the band Renaissance with his sister Jane Relf, the Yardbirds ex-drummer Jim McCarty and ex-The Nashville Teens keyboardist John Hawken.

Early life 
Relf was born in the Richmond Institution on 22 March 1943 to Mary Elsie Relf (née Vickers) and William Arthur Percy Relf. Keith had a sister Jane. His father was a builder, while his mother stayed at home.

Musical career
Relf started playing in bands around the summer of 1956 as a singer, guitarist, and harmonica player. His blues harp and vocals were as key to the Yardbirds' sound and success as were the group's three superstar lead guitarists Eric Clapton, Jeff Beck, and Jimmy Page.

Relf co-wrote many of the original Yardbirds songs ("Shapes of Things", "I Ain't Done Wrong", "Over Under Sideways Down", "Happenings Ten Years Time Ago"), later showing a leaning towards acoustic/folk music as the sixties unfolded ("Only the Black Rose"). He also sang an early version of "Dazed and Confused" in live Yardbirds concerts, after hearing musician Jake Holmes perform the song, which was later recorded by the band's successor group Led Zeppelin.

His debut solo single, "Mr. Zero", peaked at No. 50 in the UK Singles Chart in May 1966.

After the Yardbirds broke up in July 1968, Relf formed the acoustic duo Together, with fellow Yardbird Jim McCarty, followed immediately by Renaissance (which also featured his sister Jane Relf). After leaving Renaissance in 1970, he started producing other artists: Steamhammer, folk-rock band Hunter Muskett, the acoustic world music group Amber, psychedelic band Saturnalia, and blues-rock band Medicine Head (with whom he also played bass guitar). In 1974, he formed progressive/rock group Armageddon. Their self-titled debut, Armageddon, was recorded in England and released in the United States on A&M Records. The album's original liner notes used the term "supergroup"; their personnel (besides Relf) included drummer Bobby Caldwell (previously a member of Captain Beyond and Johnny Winter's band), guitarist Martin Pugh (from Steamhammer, The Rod Stewart Album, and later of 7th Order), and bassist Louis Cennamo (also formerly of Renaissance and Steamhammer).

Personal life and death  

In 1966, he married April Liversidge.  They had two sons, Danny and Jason.

Relf died in the basement of his home in 1976 at age 33 from electrocution while playing an electric guitar. He had had several health problems throughout his life, including emphysema and asthma. He may have been taking the medications commonly used to treat those diseases at the time, and these may have contributed to his inability to survive the electric shock.

At the time, it is said that Relf was in the process of putting back together the original progressive rock band Renaissance line-up, which would eventually be called Illusion. He was buried in Richmond Cemetery.

Though most sources mistakenly list 14 May as Relf's date of death (the day that many newspapers ran the story); on the official death certificate, he was declared dead on 12 May at West Middlesex Hospital.

Legacy 

Relf's posthumous 1992 Rock and Roll Hall of Fame induction with the Yardbirds was represented by his widow April, and sons Danny and Jason ("Jay").

Solo singles discography
Most of Relf's recordings were released under the name of the group he was in at the time. However, an early attempt was made to establish him as a solo musician, and two singles came out under his own name in 1966.

 "Mr. Zero" / "Knowing" – UK Columbia DB7920 / U.S. Epic 10044 (May 1966)
A-side written by Bob Lind
 "Shapes in My Mind" / "Blue Sands" – UK Columbia DB8084 / US Epic 10110 (November 1966)
B-side is an instrumental credited to Relf, but actually performed by the Outsiders (not to be confused with the US band, the Outsiders, who performed "Time Won't Let Me"). The US single featured the same version as the UK single; US promotional copies (on red vinyl) featured a complete re-edit of the song.

A further single appeared in 1989:
 "Together Now" / "All The Fallen Angels" – MCCM 89 002 (1989)
US release only. The A-side was originally recorded in 1968 by Together. The B-side was recorded on 2 May 1976, ten days before Relf's death.

References

External links 

 The Yardbirds official website
 

1943 births
1976 deaths
20th-century English singers
Alumni of Kingston University
English rock singers
English blues singers
English male singer-songwriters
English rock musicians
English blues musicians
Blues singer-songwriters
Electric blues musicians
Blues rock musicians
British blues (genre) musicians
British rhythm and blues boom musicians
British harmonica players
Blues harmonica players
People from Richmond, London
Singers from London
The Yardbirds members
Accidental deaths by electrocution
Accidental deaths in London
Burials at Richmond Cemetery
English baritones
Maracas players
Armageddon (British band) members
Renaissance (band) members
20th-century British male singers